The 29th Directors Guild of America Awards, honoring the outstanding directorial achievements in film and television in 1976, were presented in 1977.

Winners and nominees

Film

Television

Honorary Life Member
 H. C. Potter

External links
 

Directors Guild of America Awards
1976 film awards
1976 television awards
Direct
Direct
Directors